Prabhleen Sandhu (born 5 December 1983) is an Indian Punjabi film actress who rose to fame with the Indian soap on periodic freedom struggle on COLORS' Mohe Rang De as Kranti, dons a different look and role in Zee's new show, Aapki Antara as Vidya, a middle-class wife, who has trouble adjusting with her "autistic " child.

Her first film was Yaaran Naal Baharan, where she played Juhi Babbar's friend. She also acted in the Punjabi movie Mehndi Waley Hath, a 2004 Drama. She has also acted in the Punjabi movie Ek Jind Ek Jaan playing a sister of Aryan Vaid and Raj Babbar in the movie. In the film Not a Love Story, she played Anju, directed by Ram Gopal Verma and she also acted in the Punjabi film Rahe Chardi Kala Punjab Di. Her film Nabar (2013) won best Punjabi film at 60th National Film Awards.

Filmography

References

External links

 
 

Indian television actresses
Living people
Actresses in Hindi cinema
Actresses in Punjabi cinema
1983 births